This is a list of members of the  New Democratic Party Shadow Cabinet of the 39th Canadian parliament.  Positions in the shadow cabinet were announced on September 27, 2007, and includes all 30 members of the New Democratic Party caucus in the House of Commons of Canada.

The NDP does not have a leader in the Senate of Canada since it opposes the existence of that body.

See also
Cabinet of Canada
Official Opposition (Canada)
Shadow Cabinet
Official Opposition Shadow Cabinet (Canada)
Bloc Québécois Shadow Cabinet

History of the New Democratic Party (Canada)
39th Canadian Parliament
Canadian shadow cabinets